Peer Posipal (born 3 July 1962, in Hamburg) is a German former professional footballer who played as a midfielder. He spent three seasons in the Bundesliga with Eintracht Braunschweig, as well as five seasons in the 2. Bundesliga with Braunschweig and Preußen Münster.

Personal life
Peer Posipal is the son of 1954 FIFA World Cup winner Josef Posipal and the father of Patrick Posipal, also a professional footballer.

References

External links

1962 births
Living people
Footballers from Hamburg
German footballers 
Eintracht Braunschweig players
SC Preußen Münster players
Association football midfielders
Bundesliga players
2. Bundesliga players
German people of Romanian descent